Reginald Eugene White (born March 22, 1970) is a former American football defensive tackle who played four seasons in the National Football League with the San Diego Chargers and New England Patriots. He was drafted by the Chargers in the sixth round of the 1992 NFL Draft. He played college football at North Carolina A&T State University.

Early years
White played high school football for the Milford Mill Academy Millers of Milford Mill, Maryland, helping the team win the state Class C championship in 1987.

Professional career
White was selected by the San Diego Chargers with the 147th pick in the 1992 NFL Draft. He played in 22 games for the Chargers from 1992 to 1994. He played in sixteen games, starting seven, for the New England Patriots during the 1995 season.

Coaching career
White later became head coach of the Milford Mill Academy Millers.
Reggie White – Milford Mill Academy (Baltimore County)
Baltimore Ravens Coach of the week 
Coach White has led the Millers football program since 2002, following a career in the NFL as a defensive tackle, and has guided his alma mater to three Maryland Public Secondary School Athletic Association final fours, including a state championship appearance in 2017. In recent months, the Milford Mill head coach has consistently met virtually with his team to discuss numerous off the field topics - social justice and reform, the importance of family, how to handle adversity and more. Bringing in guest speakers such as Baltimore County police officers and school psychologists to speak with his team, Coach White continues to mentor his student-athletes while high school football is unable to be played on the field.

Personal life
White's son Reggie White Jr. currently plays for the Montreal Alouettes of the Canadian Football League and played college football at Monmouth. White's son Nicholas plays at Milford Mill Academy. White is married to Nicole.

References

External links
 Just Sports Stats

Living people
1970 births
American football defensive tackles
New England Patriots players
North Carolina A&T Aggies football players
San Diego Chargers players
High school football coaches in Maryland
Players of American football from Baltimore
African-American coaches of American football
African-American players of American football
21st-century African-American sportspeople
20th-century African-American sportspeople